L'Anse aux Meadows ( lit. Meadows Cove) is an archaeological site, first excavated in the 1960s, of a Norse settlement dating to approximately 1,000 years ago. The site is located on the northernmost tip of the island of Newfoundland in the Canadian province of Newfoundland and Labrador near St. Anthony.

With carbon dating estimates between 990–1050 CE, tree-ring analysis  dating to the year 1021 and a mean carbon date of 1014 overall, L'Anse aux Meadows is the only undisputed site of pre-Columbian trans-oceanic contact of Europeans with the Americas outside of Greenland. It is notable as evidence of the Norse presence in North America and for its possible connection with Leif Erikson as mentioned in  the Saga of the Greenlanders and the Saga of Erik the Red, which were written down in the 13th century. Archaeological evidence found at the site indicates that L’Anse aux Meadows may have served as a base camp for Norse exploration of North America, including regions to the south.

Spanning  of land and sea, the site contains the remains of eight buildings constructed with sod over a wood frame. In excess of 800 Norse objects have been unearthed at the site. Evidence of iron production and bronze, bone and stone artifacts have been identified. The site was designated a National Historic Site of Canada in 1968 and a World Heritage Site by UNESCO in 1978.  Parks Canada manages the site as outlined  under the Parks Canada Agency Act (1998) and the Canada National Parks Act (2000).

Etymology 
L'Anse aux Meadows is a French-English name which can be translated as "Grassland Bay" (lit. "[the] bay with [the] grasslands"). How the village itself came to be named "L'Anse aux Meadows" is debated. One possibility is that "L'Anse aux Meadows" is a corruption of the French designation , which means "Jellyfish Cove". A more recent supposition is that the name derives from "L'Anse à la Médée" (Medea Cove") the name it bears on an 1862 French naval chart. Whether Medea or Medusa, it is possible that the name refers to a French naval vessel.

History

Indigenous occupation

Before the Norse arrived in Newfoundland, there is evidence of occupations by five Indigenous groups at the site of L'Anse aux Meadows, the oldest dated at roughly 6,000 years ago. None were contemporaneous with the Norse occupation. The most prominent of these earlier occupations was by the Dorset people, who occupied the site about 300 years before the Norse. Birgitta Wallace gives radiocarbon date ranges for these groups of c. 4000–1000 BCE for the Maritime Archaic tradition, c. 1000–500 BCE for the Groswater tradition, c. 400–750 CE for the Middle Dorset, c. 800–850 CE for the Cow Head Group and Beaches traditions, and c. 1200–1500 CE for the Little Passage tradition.

Norse activity 
The Norse settlement at L'Anse aux Meadows has been dated to approximately 1,000 CE (carbon dating estimates 990–1050 CE), with a mean carbon date of 1014, an assessment that tallies with the relative dating of artifact and structure types. A 2021 Nature study, using radiocarbon analysis of three separate tree ring samples and evidence from the anomaly in atmospheric 14C concentrations in the year 993, pinpointed 1021 as a date of Norse activity at L'Anse aux Meadows.

Anthropologist John Steinberg has suggested that the site  may have been "occupied at least sporadically for perhaps 20 years". Eleanor Barraclough, a lecturer in medieval history and literature at Durham University, suggests the site was not a permanent settlement, but was instead a temporary boat repair facility. She notes there are no findings of burials, tools, agriculture or animal pens—suggesting the inhabitants abandoned the site in an orderly fashion. According to a 2019 PNAS study, there may have been Norse activity in L'Anse aux Meadows for as long as a century.

There is no way of knowing how many people lived at the site at any given time; archaeological evidence of the dwellings suggests it had the capacity of supporting 30 to 160 people. The entire population of Greenland at the time was about 2,500, meaning that the L'Anse aux Meadows site was less than 10 percent of the Norse settlement on Greenland. As Julian D. Richards notes: "It seems highly unlikely that the Norse had sufficient resources to construct a string of such settlements."

Today the area mostly consists of open, grassy lands, but 1000 years ago there were forests that were convenient for boatbuilding, housebuilding and iron extraction. The remains of eight buildings (labeled from A–J) were found. They are believed to have been constructed of sod placed over a wooden frame. Based on associated artifacts, the buildings were identified as dwellings or workshops. The largest dwelling (F) measured  and consisted of several rooms. Three small buildings (B, C, G) may have been workshops or living quarters for lower-status crew or slaves. Workshops were identified as an iron smithy (building J) containing a forge and iron slag, a carpentry workshop (building D), which generated wood debris and a specialized boat repair area containing worn rivets.

Other things found at the site consisted of common everyday Norse items, including a stone oil lamp, a whetstone, a bronze fastening pin, a bone knitting needle and part of a spindle. Stone weights, which were found in building G, may have been part of a loom. The presence of the spindle and needle suggests that women as well as men inhabited the settlement.

Food remains included butternuts, which are significant because they do not grow naturally north of New Brunswick. Their presence probably indicates the Norse inhabitants traveled farther south to obtain them. There is evidence to suggest that the Norse hunted an array of animals that inhabited the area. These included caribou, wolf, fox, bear, lynx, marten, many types of birds and fish, seal, whale and walrus. This area is no longer rich in game due in large part to the harsh winters. This forces the game to either hibernate or venture south as the wind, deep snow, and sheets of ice cover the area. These losses made the harsh winters very difficult for the Norse people at L'Anse aux Meadows. This lack of game supports archaeologists' beliefs that the site was inhabited by the Norse for a relatively short time.

Discovery and significance (1960–68)

In 1960, the archaeological remains of Norse buildings were discovered in Newfoundland by the Norwegian husband-wife team of explorer Helge Ingstad and archaeologist Anne Stine Ingstad. Based on the idea that the Old Norse name "Vinland", mentioned in the Icelandic Sagas, meant "wine-land", historians had long speculated that the region contained wild grapes. Because of this, the common hypothesis before the Ingstads' theories was that the Vinland region existed somewhere south of the northern Massachusetts coast, because that is roughly as far north as grapes grow naturally. This is a false assumption. Wild grapes have grown and still grow along the coast of New Brunswick and in the St. Lawrence River valley of Quebec. The archaeological excavation at L'Anse aux Meadows was conducted from 1960 to 1968 by an international team led by Anne Stine Ingstad.

The Ingstads doubted this hypothesis, saying "that the name Vinland probably means land of meadows...and includes a peninsula." This speculation was based on the belief that the Norse would not have been comfortable settling in areas along the American Atlantic coast. This dichotomy between the two views could have possibly been due to the two historic ways in which the first vowel sound of "Vinland" could be pronounced. The discovery of butternuts in the Norse stratum of the bog on the site by Parks Canada archaeologists implies that the Norse ventured at least as far as the coast of New Brunswick, where butternuts grow (and have grown for centuries) alongside wild grapes. The Norse thus would have had contact with the grapes of the sagas.

In 1960, George Decker, a citizen of the small fishing hamlet of L'Anse aux Meadows, led Helge Ingstad to a group of mounds near the village that the locals called the "old Indian camp". These mounds covered with grass looked like the remains of houses. Helge Ingstad and Anne Stine Ingstad carried out seven archaeological excavations there from 1961 to 1968. They investigated the remains of eight buildings and the remains of perhaps a ninth. They determined that the site was of Norse origin because of definitive similarities between the characteristics of structures and artifacts found at the site compared to sites in Greenland and Iceland from around 1000 CE.

L'Anse aux Meadows is the only confirmed Norse site in North America outside of Greenland. It represents the farthest-known extent of European exploration and settlement of the New World before the voyages of Christopher Columbus almost 500 years later. Historians have speculated that there were other Norse sites, or at least Norse-Native American trade contacts, in the Canadian Arctic. In 2012, possible Norse outposts were identified in Nanook at Tanfield Valley on Baffin Island, as well as Nunguvik, Willows Island and the Avayalik Islands. Point Rosee, in southwestern Newfoundland, shown by National Geographic and the BBC as a possible Norse site, was excavated in 2015 and 2016, without any evidence of a Norse presence being found.

National historic site (1968–present)

In November 1968, the Government of Canada named the archaeological site a National Historic Site of Canada. The site was also named a World Heritage Site in 1978 by UNESCO. After L'Anse aux Meadows was named a national historic site, the area, and its related tourist programs, have been managed by Parks Canada. After the first excavation was completed, two more excavations of the site were ordered by Parks Canada. The excavations fell under the direction of Bengt Schonbach from 1973 to 1975 and Birgitta Wallace, in 1976. Following each period of excavation, the site was reburied to protect and conserve the cultural resources.

The remains of seven Norse buildings are on display at the national historic site. North of the Norse remains are reconstructed buildings, built in the late 20th century, as a part of an interpretive display for the national historic site. The remains of an aboriginal hunting camp are also located at the site, southwest of the Norse remains. Other amenities at the site includes picnic areas, and a visitor centre.

Connection with Vinland sagas

Adam of Bremen, a German cleric, was the first European to mention Vinland. In a text he composed around 1073, he wrote that

This excerpt is from a history Adam composed of the archbishops of Hamburg-Bremen who held ecclesiastical authority over Scandinavia (the original home of the Norse people) at the time.

Norse sagas are written versions of older oral traditions. Two Icelandic sagas, commonly called the Saga of the Greenlanders and the Saga of Erik the Red, describe the experiences of Norse Greenlanders who discovered and attempted to settle land to the west of Greenland, which they called Vinland. The sagas suggest that the Vinland settlement failed because of conflicts within the Norse community, as well as between the Norse and the native people they encountered, whom they called the Skræling.

The L'Anse aux Meadows site served as an exploration base and winter camp for expeditions heading southward into the Gulf of St. Lawrence. The settlements of Vinland mentioned in these two sagas, Leifsbudir (Leif Ericson) and Hóp (Norse Greenlanders), have both been claimed to be the L'Anse aux Meadows site.

See also

Former colonies and territories in Canada
History of Newfoundland and Labrador
List of National Historic Sites of Canada in Newfoundland and Labrador
List of oldest buildings in Canada
List of World Heritage Sites in Canada
Norse colonization of North America
St. Barbe-L'Anse aux Meadows
Thorfinn Karlsefni
Vinland map

Notes

Further reading
Campbell, Claire Elizabeth (2017). Nature, Place, and Story: Rethinking Historic Sites in Canada. Montreal and Kingston: McGill-Queen's University Press. .
  (paperback).
  (paperback).  (ebook).

External links

L'Anse aux Meadows National Historic Site, Parks Canada
L'Anse aux Meadows National Historic Site by UNESCO
 by the National Film Board of Canada

11th century in North America
Archaeological museums in Canada
Archaeological sites in Newfoundland and Labrador
Coves of Canada
European medieval architecture in North America
Pre-Columbian architecture
Ghost towns in Newfoundland and Labrador
Heritage sites in Newfoundland and Labrador
History museums in Canada
Culture of Newfoundland and Labrador
Museums in Newfoundland and Labrador
National Historic Sites in Newfoundland and Labrador
Ruins in Canada
Viking Age museums
Viking Age populated places
Viking Age in Canada
World Heritage Sites in Canada